This is a list of the National Register of Historic Places listings in Nolan County, Texas.

This is intended to be a complete list of properties and districts listed on the National Register of Historic Places in Nolan County, Texas. There are one district and three individual properties listed on the National Register in the county. Two properties are also Recorded Texas Historic Landmarks.

Current listings

The locations of National Register properties and districts may be seen in a mapping service provided.

|}

See also

National Register of Historic Places listings in Texas
Recorded Texas Historic Landmarks in Nolan County

References

External links

Nolan County, Texas
Nolan County
Buildings and structures in Nolan County, Texas